HMS LST-412 was a United States Navy  that was transferred to the Royal Navy during World War II. As with many of her class, the ship was never named. Instead, she was referred to by her hull designation.

Construction
LST-412 was laid down on 24 September 1942, under Maritime Commission (MARCOM) contract, MC hull 932, by the Bethlehem-Fairfield Shipyard, Baltimore, Maryland; launched 16 November 1942; then transferred to the United Kingdom and commissioned on 23 January 1943.

Service history 
LST-412 participated with the Royal Navy during the invasion of Normandy, June 1944. 

LST-412 saw no active service in the United States Navy. She was decommissioned and returned to United States Navy custody on 23 January 1946, and struck from the Navy list on 20 March 1946. On 16 December 1947, LST-412 was sold to the Northern Metals Co., Philadelphia, Pennsylvania, and subsequently scrapped.

See also 
 List of United States Navy LSTs

Notes 

Citations

Bibliography 

Online resources

External links

Ships built in Baltimore
1942 ships
LST-1-class tank landing ships of the Royal Navy
World War II amphibious warfare vessels of the United Kingdom
S3-M2-K2 ships